Barukčić, rendered Barukčič in Slovenian, is a Croat surname.  People with the name include:
 (1805–1834), Croatian poet from Bosnia and Herzegovina
Igor Barukčič (born 1990), Slovenian footballer
Igor Barukčić (born 1982), Croatian footballer

References

Croatian surnames